The 2020–21 season was the 94th season in the existence of OGC Nice and the club's 19th consecutive season in the top flight of French football. In addition to the domestic league, Nice participated in this season's editions of the Coupe de France and the UEFA Europa League. The season covered the period from 1 July 2020 to 30 June 2021.

The head coach Patrick Vieira was relieved of his post after a five-game losing streak. He was replaced by assistant Adrian Ursea.

Players

First-team squad

Out on loan

Transfers

In

Out

Pre-season and friendlies

Competitions

Overview

Ligue 1

League table

Results summary

Results by round

Matches
The league fixtures were announced on 9 July 2020.

Coupe de France

UEFA Europa League

Group stage

The group stage draw was held on 2 October 2020.

Statistics

Appearances and goals

|-
! colspan="12" style="background:#dcdcdc; text-align:center"| Goalkeepers

|-
! colspan="12" style="background:#dcdcdc; text-align:center"| Defenders

|-
! colspan="12" style="background:#dcdcdc; text-align:center"| Midfielders

|-
! colspan="12" style="background:#dcdcdc; text-align:center"| Forwards

|-
! colspan="12" style="background:#dcdcdc; text-align:center"| Players transferred out during the season

|-

Goalscorers

Notes

References

External links

OGC Nice seasons
Nice
Nice